The Maroochy River is a river in South East Queensland, Australia. The river rises from the eastern slopes of the Blackall Range and flows east through Eumundi, before entering the sea at Cotton Tree, Maroochydore. Other populated centres in the catchment include Nambour, Eudlo, Yandina and Coolum.

The suburb south of Airport and North of River and west of Motorway is known as Maroochy River.

Course
The watershed of the Maroochy River encompasses  of undulating hills which have been cleared for agriculture and urban uses.

There are two main arms: North and South Maroochy Rivers. Tributaries of the river include Petrie Creek and its major tributary Paynter Creek, Eudlo Creek, Coolum Creek, Doonan Creek and Yandina Creek.

There is one Canal system open to the river Maroochy Waters and a second Canal system with restricted access to river namely Twin Waters. There are also numerous lake systems which drain to the river and its creeks such as Sunshine Cove.

There are a number of named Islands in the river including Pincushion Island, Goat Island, Channel Island, Chambers Island & Bungee's Island.

Cultural Significance
Maroochy is derived from the Turrbal people's name for a black swan - 'marutchi'. Andrew Petrie named the river Maroochy after the black swans he saw during an exploration of the area in 1842. On this trip there were two Turrbal aboriginal men accompanying Petrie who presumably advised him of the name of the swan. The Maroochy River is a culturally significant river as Indigenous cultural heritage records depict stories of the formation of the river together with other locally significant lands including Mudjimba Island, Mount Coolum and Mount Ninderry.

Environment
The Maroochy River is part of a blue carbon initiative, Australia first partnership, that undertakes to provide land use options for recreation, farming and the like, via environmentally effective approaches that maintain and improve the natural environment. The area is described as the ‘Blue Heart’, spans more than 5000 hectares aimed to preserve the benefits of the natural ecosystem the wetland areas, whilst improving human and environmental health and working toward a zero net emissions target. 

The Maroochy River and wetland areas bordered by Bli Bli, Marcoola, Mudjimba, Diddillibah, Twin Waters and Maroochydore suburbs, consists of several Australian Commonwealth, 'nationally important wetlands' and 'protected area' locations.<

Floods
Significant floods on the Maroochy River have occurred in 1893, 1951, 1974 and 1992. In 1994 the Maroochy River flood warning system was set up to provide river height predictions for the Maroochy Shire Council.

History
In the early days of settlement, the only way to travel from Yandina to Maroochydore was by boat along the Maroochy River.

By 1930, growth of urban settlements improved due to transport access changing in the Maroochy River region.

See also

List of rivers of Australia

References

External links

Rivers of Queensland
Geography of Sunshine Coast, Queensland